Man Holding a Book or Man with a Book is an oil on panel painting by Parmigianino, executed c. 1529, now in the Kunsthistorisches Museum in Vienna.

It was bought at the sale of the collection of Charles I of England in 1651 by Greene and was recorded in Rudolf II's collection in Prague in 1685, at which time it was thought to be a work by Correggio, an artist with a strong influence on Parmigianino early in the latter's career. It arrived in Vienna in 1721, still with that attribution, and it was only in 1857 that Ktaft restored its present attribution, with the agreement of most other later art historians (Frölich-Bum, 1921, Gamba, 1940, Longhi, 1958, Di Giampaolo, 1991, Gould, 1994, Chiusa, 2001). Copertini (1932) and Barocchi (1950) argue it is a copy of an autograph work, whilst Arturo Quintavalle (1948) assigns it to Michelangelo Anselmi or Girolamo da Carpi.

References

1529 paintings
Paintings in the collection of the Kunsthistorisches Museum
Paintings by Parmigianino